Archeolimulus is a prehistoric xiphosuran, related to the modern horseshoe crab. It is the only genus in the family Archeolimulidae, and was found in the Czech Republic in rocks of Middle Ordovician age.

References

External links
The Paleobiology Database: Archeolimulus

Xiphosura
Fossil taxa described in 1968
Middle Ordovician arthropods